Thysanoessa raschii, sometimes known as Arctic krill, is one of the most common euphausiid species of the subarctic and Arctic seas.

T. raschii is a major prey item of several taxa, planktivorous fishes and marine mammals. It is also a common prey item of seabirds, including shearwaters.

This species goes through a number of stages in its development. Roderick Macdonald defined the characteristics of fourteen stages, or 'furcilia'.

References

Krill
Crustaceans described in 1864
Taxa named by Michael Sars